This is a list of sister states, regions, and cities in the U.S. state of Florida. Sister cities, known in Europe as twin towns, are cities which partner with each other to promote human contact and cultural links, although this partnering is not limited to cities and often includes counties, regions, states and other sub-national entities.

Florida jurisdictions often partner with foreign cities through Sister Cities International, an organization whose goal is to "promote peace through mutual respect, understanding, and cooperation". Sister cities interact with each other across a broad range of activities, from health care and education to business and the arts.

Sisters of Florida State, cities and counties
The lists below were compiled from the official Sister Cities International website (unless noted), corrected on orthography and region listed. Sister Cities will recognize cities only when the partnership is filed with them and remove relationships when one of the involved cities makes a formal request. Partnerships can be active, inactive (no actions taken from any of the partners for some time) or officially canceled. The list below has relationships in all three statuses. Examples of canceled partnerships are Hialeah-Managua and West Miami-León, Nicaragua, canceled because of political differences during the Sandinista regime; Hollywood-San Salvador, canceled as a protest against the Salvadoran Civil War; and Boca Raton-Spandau Borough, Berlin. Years can be approximate; in this case the number is followed by "~". The year listed will be the first date that the relationship is mentioned in media articles.

Florida state

Florida cities and counties

<onlyinclude>

References
General
 
 
 

Specific

Florida
 
Sister cities
Populated places in Florida